Zygaena huguenini  is a species of moth in the Zygaenidae family. It is found in the Pamir mountains. In Seitz it is described - a large heavy-built Zygaena from the Pamir. Instead of the 3 pair of spots the forewing bears a large patch occupying the whole marginal area; the 1. and 2. pair of spots of the forewing are separated by a black transverse band, the spots of each pair however being united.

References

External links
Images representing Zygaena huguenini  at Bold

Moths described in 1887
Zygaena